Leucosolenida is an order of sponges in the class Calcarea. Species in the order Leucosolenida are calcareous with a skeleton composed exclusively of free spicules without calcified non-spicular reinforcements.

References 

http://species-identification.org/species.php?species_group=sponges&selected=beschrijving&menuentry=groepen&record=Leucosolenida